Billericay railway station is on the Shenfield to Southend Line in the east of England, serving the town of Billericay in the Basildon district of the county of Essex. The vast majority of services on the Shenfield to Southend Line connect to the Great Eastern Main Line, linking  station in Southend-on-Sea to Liverpool Street station in London. The Engineer's Line Reference for the line is SSV and the station's three-letter station code is BIC. The platforms have an operational length for 12 carriages.

Billericay station is located in close proximity to the town's centre and industrial areas, sunk into a cutting in which the railway line is situated. The station and trains serving it are currently operated by Abellio Greater Anglia.

History
The line from Shenfield to Wickford, together with Billericay station, was opened for goods on 19 November 1888 and for passengers on 1 January 1889 by the Great Eastern Railway.[1]

There was a goods yard on the 'down' (eastbound) side of the running lines to the north-west of the station, including a goods shed, cattle pens and a crane. There was a signal box on the 'up' side to the north-west of the station. Goods traffic ceased on 15 June 1967 and the goods shed was demolished soon after. The Shenfield to Southend Victoria line was originally electrified using 1.5 kV DC overhead line electrification (OLE) on 31 December 1956. This was changed to 6.25 kV AC in November 1960 and to 25 kV AC on 25 January 1979.

There were two sidings at Ramsden Bellhouse, 2.75 miles east of Billericay station on the 'down' (north) side of the line. The sidings closed on 22 August 1960.

As part of the National Station Improvements scheme, the station underwent improvement works costing around £1.7 million, which were completed in January 2012. These changes have completely altered the aspect of the station from the road side. A less changed 'twin' of Billericay station is Buckhurst Hill tube station, another Great Eastern Railway station, which was built in 1892.

Services 

The station, and all trains serving it, are operated by Greater Anglia.  The typical off-peak service is three trains per hour between Liverpool Street and Southend Victoria. During peak hours additional trains also run between Liverpool Street/Shenfield and Southminster along the Crouch Valley Line.

References

External links 

Railway stations in Essex
DfT Category C2 stations
Transport in the Borough of Basildon
Former Great Eastern Railway stations
Greater Anglia franchise railway stations
Railway station
William Neville Ashbee railway stations
Railway stations in Great Britain opened in 1889